Henry Rodenburg (–13 December 1899) was a United States Army soldier who received the Medal of Honor. His award came for gallantry in the Indian Wars.

Biography
Rodenburg was born in Germany in 1851. He joined the army and achieved the rank of corporal.

Rodenburg died on 13 December 1899 and is buried in Cypress Hills National Cemetery, Section 2, Grave 5825, in Brooklyn, New York City, New York.

Medal of Honor citation
"For gallantry in engagements at Cedar Creek, Montana and other campaigns during the period 21 October 1876 to 8 January 1877, while serving with Company A, 5th U.S. Infantry. Private Rodenburg served in a series of engagements against the Sioux Indians in the Montana Territory. In actions at Cedar Creek, Private Rodenburg personally helped in the security of settlers throughout the region. For extreme gallantry, he was awarded the Medal of Honor and promoted Corporal. Date of Issue: 27 April 1877."

See also

List of Medal of Honor recipients
List of Medal of Honor recipients for the Indian Wars

References

1851 births
1899 deaths
German emigrants to the United States
United States Army Medal of Honor recipients
United States Army soldiers
German-born Medal of Honor recipients
Burials at Cypress Hills National Cemetery
American Indian Wars recipients of the Medal of Honor